Arthé Guimond (May 22, 1931 – February 6, 2013) was the Roman Catholic bishop of the Diocese of Grouard-McLennan, Canada.

Ordained to the priesthood in 1957, Guimond was named bishop in 2000 and retired in 2006.

Notes

1931 births
2013 deaths
21st-century Roman Catholic bishops in Canada
Roman Catholic archbishops of Grouard–McLennan